Nymphargus luteopunctatus is a species of frog in the family Centrolenidae, formerly placed in Cochranella. This frog has 2-3 large vomerine teeth and is green with yellow spots bordered by black. When viewed from above it has a rounded snout. It is endemic to the Cordillera Occidental in the Cauca Department, Colombia.

Its natural habitats are tropical moist montane forests and rivers.

References

luteopunctatus
Amphibians of Colombia
Endemic fauna of Colombia
Taxonomy articles created by Polbot
Amphibians described in 1996